Temples of North Karnataka

North Karnataka has innumerable sites in the Temple Map of Karnataka, India, with its some of its still surviving monuments going back to the 7th century AD. The Badami Chalukyas were the builders of rock cut caves and ancient temple complexes. At Pattadakal, there are Temples in the Dravidian style along with Temples in styles that were later adopted in Eastern and Central India. The sculptural quality in these temples is outstanding.

The Badami Chalukyas were succeeded by the Rashtrakutas and the Kalyani Chalukyas.

The Vijayanagar Empire marks the period of great Temple building activity in Karnataka and these temples are characterized by the building of pillared mandapas and lofty entrance towers The Vijayanagar Empire was destroyed by the Deccan Sultanates in the 16th century and the ruins can be seen at Hampi.

The temples of the coastal region are markedly different in architectural styles.

Haveri region

1	Adikesava Temple at Kaginele
2	Basavanna Temple at Haveri
3	Basaveshwara Temple Kuruvathi
4	Chalukya Temple at Chaudayyadanapura
5	Galageshwara Temple Galaganatha
6	Kalahasteshwara Temple at Kaginele
7	Lakshmi Temple at Kaginele
8	Mallari Temple at Gudda Guddaapura near Ranebennur
9	Narasimha Temple at Kaginele
10	Sangameshwara Temple at Kaginele
11	Siddhadeva Temple at Haveri
12	Someshwara Temple at Kaginele
13	Virabhadra Temple at Kaginele

Gadag region
	, Jain temple at Lakkundi in Gadag District, North Karnataka
	Kasivisvesvara temple, Lakkundi, Lakkundi
	Trikuteshwara Temple at Gadag
	Amriteshwara Temple at Annigeri
	Basappa Temple at Annigeri
	Bhrama Jinalaya at Lakkundi
	Dodda Basappa Temple at Dambal
	Gajina Basappa Temple at Annigeri
	Hire Hanuman Temple at Annigeri
	Someshwara Temple at Gadag
	Someshwara Temple at Lakshmeshwar
	Suryanarayana Temple at Lakkundi
	Vira Narayana Temple at Gadag

Badami region
1. Temples at Badami

Badami is in the Bagalkot District.

Badami known formerly as Vatapi was the ancient capital of the Chalukyas.
This site has several temples. The Bhutanatha hill has 4 temples, with several beautiful bas reliefs.
These cave temples date back to the 6th century. The Dattatreya temple goes back to the 12th century.
The Mallikarjuna temple with a star shaped plan goes back to the 11th century.

Badami Cave Temples

Badami arrayed with most picturesque location is worth a visit site.

Badami is famous for its cave temples all hewn out of sandstone on the cliff of a hill.
 
The region is adorned with pristine blue lake, famous ancient temple shrines, museum and above all Hindu and Jain caves, carved out of sandstone. The largest and most ornamental is the third cave temple dedicated to Vishnu.

Agastya teertha reservoir thronged with temples dedicated to Vishnu and Shiva.
The Bhutanath temple that lend their name to the lake beneath the cave temples.

2. Temples at Aihole

Aihole is in the Southern portion of Bagalkot District.

More than 100 temples are located in Aihole. Hindu structural temples in Deccan originated here. The Durga temple is known for its apsidal plan, exquisite carvings and its pillared corridors. Much of the temples here date back to the 6th and 7th centuries. The second phase of temples here date back to the 12th and 13th centuries.

3. Banashankari Temple at Banashankari near Badami

Koppal region
1. Jambunatha Swamy Hill Temple at Hospet

2. Kanakachalapathi Temple at Kanakagiri

Kanakachalapathi Temple at Kanakagiri, is located near Gangawati in Koppal District. This is a beautiful temple built by the Kanakagiri Naiks. This temple has several stone and wooden statues and plaster models. It has a beautiful tank surrounded by sculptured walls.

3. Ranganatha Temple at Anegondi

4. Virupaksha Temple at Hampi

5. Vithala Temple at Hampi

6. Navalinga Temples at Kuknur

7. Pattabhirama Temple at Hampi

Pattabhirama Temple is situated in the city of Hampi. Lord Rama is the holy deity who is worshipped here with full dedication. This majestic temple is known for its splendid architecture that dates back to Vijayanagar period.
 
8. Mahadeva Temple (Itagi) near Koppal

It is splendidly decorated. The richly carved pillars, beautiful inner hall, and the shikhara are its highlights. This temple dedicated to Shiva is considered to be one of the best Chalukya Temples.

Hubli-Dharwad region

1. Ranganatha Nagareshwara Temple at Bankapura

2. Siddheshwara Temple at Bankapura

3. Chandramouleshwara Temple at Unkal, Hubballi

Karwar region

1. Murdeshwara Temple at Murdeshwara (Bhatkal)

Murdeshwara, Tallest Hindu Temple Gopura and Shiva Statue in the World

2. Mahabaleshwar Temple at Gokarna

3. Shri Marikamba Temple at Sirsi

One of the biggest temple in the region with biggest Goddess idol. Fair is held every two years.

Raichur region
1. Dattatreya Temple at Koormagadde Naradagadde

2. Markandeshwara Temple at Kallur

Markandeshwara Temple at Kallur is dedicated to Lord Markandeshwara (Shiva). Krishnadevaraya of the 
Vijayanagar Empire worshipped in these temples along with his family.
The Markandeshwara is the oldest temple with exquisitely carved, polished pillars.

3. Narada Temple at Naradagadde

Narada Temple is dedicated to the Divine Sage Narada. This temple is constructed on Naradagadde one of the most scenic islands on the Krishna River. Due to its exquisite location the temple is not only visited by devotees but also by the travel enthusiast who make their day on the bank of the river.

See also
 Western Chalukya temples
 List of North Karnataka historical sites

References

Hindu temples in Uttara Kannada district
North Kannara
Lists of buildings and structures in Karnataka